Filippos Dimitriadis (born 13 August 2002) is a Greek professional footballer who plays as a left-back for Super League 2 club Panathinaikos B.

References

2002 births
Living people
Greek footballers
Gamma Ethniki players
Super League Greece 2 players
Xanthi F.C. players
Panathinaikos F.C. B players
Association football fullbacks
Footballers from Xanthi